Boeree is a surname. Notable people with the surname include:

C. George Boeree (1952–2021), American professor of psychology and language creator
Liv Boeree (born 1984), British poker player, television presenter, speaker, and writer